The Vanderbilt ADHD Diagnostic Rating Scale (VADRS) is a psychological assessment tool for attention deficit hyperactivity disorder (ADHD) symptoms and their effects on behavior and academic performance in children ages 6–12. This measure was developed by Mark L Wolraich at the Oklahoma Health Sciences Center and includes items related to oppositional defiant disorder, conduct disorder, anxiety, and depression, disorders often comorbid with ADHD.

There are two versions available: a parent form that contains 55 questions, and a teacher form that contains 43 questions. Shorter follow-up versions of the VADRS are also available for parents and teachers and consists of 26 questions with an additional 12 side effect measures. Comparing scores from the different versions of the VADRS with other psychological measures have suggested the scores have good but limited reliability and validity across multiple samples. The VADRS has only been recently developed, however, so clinical application of the measure is limited.

Development and history 
The VADRS was developed by Wolraich with the aim to add common comorbid conditions associated with ADHD that was lacking from previous assessments. As public awareness of ADHD has increased, epidemiological studies have found a prevalence rate of 4–12% in children of ages 6–12 throughout the United States. Not only is ADHD the most commonly encountered childhood-onset disorder in neurodevelopment, there is also a high comorbidity rate linking ADHD with other behavioral, emotional and learning problems and disabilities. As a need to obtain a defined population sample due to a lack of funds, Wolraich developed the teacher VADRS. The teacher rating scales are important, because current diagnostic guidelines require that symptoms of ADHD be seen in more than one setting before making a diagnosis.

Scoring and interpretation 

Both parent and teacher assessment scales have two components: symptom assessment and impairment in performance. The symptom assessment component screens for symptoms relevant to inattentive and hyperactive ADHD subtypes. To meet criteria for ADHD diagnoses, one must have 6 positive responses to either the core 9 inattentive symptoms or core 9 hyperactive symptoms, or both.

Both the parent and the teacher versions ask the respondent to rate the frequency of a child's behaviors on a 0–3 scale as follows:

0: "never";
1: "occasionally";
2: "often";
3: "very often".

A positive response is either a score of 2 or 3 ("often" to "very often").

The final 8 questions of both versions ask the respondent to rate the child's performance in school and his or her interactions with others on a 1–5 scale, with 1–2 meaning "above average", 3 meaning "average", and 4–5 meaning "problematic".

To meet criteria for ADHD, there must be at least one score for the performance set that is either a 4 or 5, as these scores indicate impairment in performance.

Parent version 
The parent version of the Vanderbilt ADHD Diagnostic Rating Scale contains 6 subscales. Behaviors are included in the total for each subscale if they are scored as a 2 or a 3. The rules for scoring are as follows:

ADHD inattentive type: Must score either a 2 or 3 on six or more items in questions 1–9, and score of 1 or 2 on any items in the performance section.
ADHD hyperactive/impulsive type: Must score either a 2 or 3 on six or more items in questions 10–18, and a score of 1 or 2 on any items in the performance section.
ADHD combined type: Meets criteria for both ADHD inattentive type and hyperactive/impulsive type.
Oppositional defiant disorder (ODD): Must score either a 2 or a 3 on four or more items in questions 19–26.
Conduct disorder: Must score either a 2 or 3 on three or more items in questions 27–40.
Anxiety/depression: Must score either a 2 or 3 on three or more items in questions 41–47.

Teacher version 
The teacher version of the Vanderbilt ADHD Diagnostic Rating Scale contains 5 subscales. Behaviors are included in the total for each subscale if they are scored as a 2 or a 3. A score of 1 or 2 on at least one question in the performance section indicates impairment. The rules for scoring are as follows:

ADHD inattentive type: Must score either a 2 or 3 on six or more items in questions 1–9.
ADHD hyperactive/impulsive type: Must score either a 2 or 3 on six or more items in questions 10–18.
ADHD combined type: Meets criteria for both ADHD inattentive type and hyperactive/impulsive type.
Oppositional defiant disorder (ODD): Must score either a 2 or a 3 on three or more items in questions 19–28.
Anxiety/depression: Must score either a 2 or 3 on three or more items in questions 29–35.

Reliability

Validity

Impact 
There is a high comorbidity of learning disorders (LDs) in children with ADHD, and for that reason the VADRS has been studied to determine if the performance item questions on the VARS can reliably predict if the child with ADHD has a comorbid LD (e.g. math, reading, spelling LDs). Results of a receiver operating characteristic (ROC) analysis show that children with ADHD can be reliably ruled out from have a comorbid LD based on the performance items on the VARS. This is clinically useful because it allows those without LDs to be ruled out and therefore reduce the amount of unnecessary referrals to healthcare professionals.

Limitations of the first edition
At the time of publication, the VADRS was a fairly new instrument. Test standardization procedures had been completed on a limited range of populations, normative data were only developed for the teacher version, and the comorbidity subscales were not based on the DSM-IV. The current incarnation of the VADRS, now in its third edition, has been adapted for DSM-5 criteria.

See also 
Attention deficit hyperactivity disorder
Oppositional defiant disorder

Notes

References

Further reading

External links

 Parent (55-item) version
 VADRS (Parent version) - Psychology tools - Automatically scored online version
  VADRS (Parent version) - PDF
 VADRS (Parent follow-up version) - PDF - Duke Children's 
 VADRS (Parent version) - Scoring instructions - PDF
 Teacher (43-item) version
 VADRS (Teacher version) - PDF
 VADRS (Teacher follow-up version) - PDF - Duke Children's
 VADRS (Teacher version) - Scoring instructions - PDF
 Other
 EffectiveChildTherapy.org guidelines on ADHD - Society of Clinical Child and Adolescent Psychology
 Cognitive Behavioral Therapy for adult ADHD - Society of Clinical Psychology

Psychology articles needing expert attention
Attention deficit hyperactivity disorder
Screening and assessment tools in child and adolescent psychiatry
Neuropsychological tests